The 67 civil parishes in Chichester District are listed below. The Sussex Family History Group have produced a map showing the location of each parish.

References

Chichester District
Civil parishes in West Sussex
Chichester